Guacotecti is a municipality in the Cabañas department of El Salvador.

History 
Guacotecti already existed in the first half of the 16th century when Spaniards came here. Although founded and inhabited by Lenca tribes, Guacotecti was conquered at the end of the 15th century by Yaqui or Pipil warriors. Indeed, Guacotecti, in Nahuatl language, means "High Priest of the Treasures".

References 

Municipalities of the Cabañas Department